Julian Boyd may refer to:

Julian P. Boyd (1903–1980), American professor of history at Princeton University and first editor of The Papers of Thomas Jefferson
Julian C. Boyd (1931–2005), American linguist, professor at the University of California, Berkeley
Julian Boyd (basketball) (born 1990), American college basketball player